C. D. Baker may refer to:

Charles Duncan Baker, a mayor of Las Vegas
C. David Baker (born  1952), American football executive
Charles D. Baker (attorney) (1846–1934), an Assistant United States Attorney